Santiago Creole is the name given to the Cape Verdean Creole spoken mainly on Santiago Island of  Cape Verde.  It belongs to the Sotavento Creoles branch of Creole.

Santiago Creole is the linguistic entity of the most important island of Cape Verde, and the linguistic entity of the capital of the country, Praia, situated in the same island.

Characteristics
Besides the main characteristics of Sotavento Creoles the Santiago Creole has also the following ones:
 The progressive aspect of the present is formed by putting sâ tâ before the verbs: sâ tâ + V.
 In the verbs, the stress goes back to the before the last syllable in the forms for the present. Ex.: cánta  instead of cantâ  “to sing”, mêxe  or mêxi  instead of mexê  “to move”, pârti  instead of partí  “to leave”, cômpo  or cômpu  instead of compô  “to fix”, búmbu  instead of bumbú  “to put on the back”.
 Some speakers pronounce the voiced sibilants as voiceless. Ex. cássa  instead of cása  “house”, ôxi  instead of ôji  “today”.
Ex.: cáru  instead of cárru  “car”, féru  instead of férru  “iron”, curâl  instead of currál  “corral”.
 The sound  is slightly aspirated .
 The nasal diphthongs are de-nasalized. Ex.: mâi  instead of mãi  “mother”, nâu  instead of nãu  “no”.
 The stressed sound  is pronounced  when it is before the sound  at the end of words. Ex.: curâl  instead of currál  “corral”, mâl  instead of mál  “bad”, Tarrafâl  instead of Tarrafál  “Tarrafal” (place name).

Vocabulary

Grammar

Phonology

Alphabet

External links
Dicionário Caboverdiano Português On-Line A Santiago Creole / Portuguese on-line dictionary. (in Portuguese)
Santiago Creole
Poetry in Santiago Creole

References

Further reading
 A Parábola do Filho Pródigo no crioulo de Santiago, do Fogo, da Brava, de Santo Antão, de S. Nicolau e da Boa Vista: O crioulo de Cabo Verde (Botelho da Costa, Joaquim Vieira & Custódio José Duarte, 1886)
 Dicionário Caboverdiano-Português, Variante de Santiago (Quint(-Abrial), Nicolas, Lisboa: Verbalis, 1998)
 Dicionário Caboverdiano-Português, Variante de Santiago (Quint(-Abrial), Nicolas, Lisboa: Verbalis-Priberam, CD-ROM, 1998)
 Dicionário do Crioulo da Ilha de Santiago - Alemão (Lang, Jürgen; Tübingen, 2002)
 O Cabo-verdiano em 45 Lições (Veiga, Manuel; Praia: INIC, 2002)
 Crioulo de Cabo Verde — Situação Linguística da Zona do Barlavento (Delgado, Carlos Alberto; Praia: IBNL, 2008)
 A Grammar of Santiago Creole (Cape Verde) = Gramática do Crioulo da Ilha de Santiago (Cabo Verde) (Jürgen Lang; Erlangen 2012 )
 A Grammar of Santiago Creole (Cape Verde) = Gramática do Crioulo da Ilha de Santiago (Cabo Verde) (Jürgen Lang; Erlangen 2012 )
 Les langues des autres dans la créolisation : théorie et exemplification par le créole d'empreinte wolof à l'île Santiago du Cap Vert (Jürgen Lang; Tübingen: Narr, 2009)